The City of Botany Bay was a local government area in the eastern region of Sydney, in the state of New South Wales, Australia. The area encompassed the suburbs to the north of Botany Bay, such as Botany. First proclaimed in 1888 as the "Borough of Botany", the council became the "Municipality of Botany" from 1906 to 1996, when it was proclaimed a city as the "City of Botany Bay".

The city was amalgamated with the neighbouring City of Rockdale on 9 September 2016 to form Bayside Council. The last Mayor of the City of Botany Bay prior to amalgamation was Cr. Ben Keneally, a member of the Labor Party and the husband of Kristina Keneally, a former Premier of New South Wales.

Suburbs in the local government area 
Suburbs in the City of Botany Bay were:
 Banksmeadow
 Botany
 Botany Bay
 Daceyville
 Eastgardens
 Eastlakes
 Hillsdale
 Mascot (minor part located within Marrickville Council)
 Pagewood (parts are located in City of Randwick council)
 Rosebery (parts are located in City of Sydney council)

History

First proclaimed in 1888 as the "Borough of Botany", the first council, divided into three wards (Booralee Ward, Cook Ward, Banks Ward), was elected on 9 June 1888. On 15 July 1899, the Botany Town Hall, designed by Byera Hadley, was opened by the Governor, Lord Beauchamp. The town hall remained the seat and primary meeting-place of the council until amalgamation in 2016.

The council became the "Municipality of Botany" from 1906 to 11 May 1996, when it was proclaimed a city as the "City of Botany Bay" by the Governor of New South Wales, Gordon Samuels at Sir Joseph Banks Park in Botany. The council wards were abolished from 31 January 1908. Under the Local Government (Areas) Act 1948, the Municipality of Mascot (formerly North Botany), which was located immediately to the North, was amalgamated into Botany.

ICAC Operation Ricco
In February 2016, the NSW Independent Commission Against Corruption (ICAC) commenced a public inquiry (known as Operation Ricco) into allegations that the former chief financial officer employed by the Council and other Council employees, dishonestly exercised official functions to obtain financial benefits for themselves and others by causing fraudulent payments of more than 4.2 million to be made by the Council through false invoicing to either themselves, or various entities. It was also alleged that the former Chief Financial Officer and the Council employees dishonestly exercised official functions to obtain financial benefits for themselves and others by using Council resources. The inquiry heard that certain senior staff were "totally unqualified" for their positions, and that a culture of "extremely poor corporate governance" allowed official corruption to occur.

It was also revealed that the council's General Manager until 2011, Peter Fitzgerald, had used thousands of dollars in "discretionary" council funds for personal items, private travel for himself and family, in addition to receiving annual cheques for $20,000 from the council for travelling expenses. Fitzgerald admitted that he had not seen a single statement for any of his Council accounts until shortly before his retirement in 2011, and was not aware if he had exceeded those "discretionary" limits.

In July 2017, ICAC released its report and found that former chief financial officer, Gary Goodman, and eleven other council employees had acted corruptly, after raising more than $5 million in fake invoices and charging more than $600,000 in personal expenditure on council credit cards, and recommended prosecutions against all. However, despite the specific findings against individuals, the final report noted in particular that "The scale, breadth and duration of corruption at the Council cannot be attributed to a few rogue individuals alone. Overwhelming failures in the Council’s procedures and governance framework created significant opportunities for corruption, and Mr Goodman and others took full advantage."

With the merger of Botany Bay into Bayside Council in September 2016, the legacy of "significant breakdowns in administrative, financial and governance internal controls identified in the former council" had ramifications for the auditing and accounting processes in the new Council with the Council stating that it was unable "to ensure completeness of [their] financial statements as a whole", and the first Mayor of Bayside Council, Bill Saravinovski, in particular noted that, "the misappropriations and costs of remediation result in a net fund deficit of $17 million, placing Bayside Council at a significant disadvantage".

Creation of Bayside Council

There was significant community opposition to the merger from within both communities. In Botany Bay, residents were given the chance to have their say in a community poll which was held on 27 February 2016. Ultimately 97.8 per cent of Botany Bay residents voted 'no' when asked the question 'Do you agree that the City of Botany Bay should merge with Rockdale City Council?'. Botany Bay attempted to seek a compromise by proposing to merge with the City of Randwick and parts of the City of Sydney.

With the proclamation of the majority of council amalgamations on 12 May 2016, Botany Bay Council appealed the decision in the Supreme Court of New South Wales, thereby delaying the proposed amalgamation until a decision was made by the Court. The Supreme Court rejected the appeal in early September 2016, and the Minister for Local Government, Paul Toole, moved quickly to proclaim the formation of Bayside Council on 9 September 2016, with the former Administrator of Central Darling Shire, Greg Wright, appointed as the Administrator.

Demographics 
As of the 2011 census, there were 39,356 people in the Botany Bay local government area, of these 49.5% were male and 50.5% were female. Aboriginal and Torres Strait Islander people made up 1.6% of the population. The median age of people in the City of Botany Bay was 37 years. Children aged 0 – 14 years made up 18.2% of the population and people aged 65 years and over made up 14.4% of the population. Of people in the area aged 15 years and over, 47.6% were married and 11.4% were either divorced or separated.

Population growth in the City of Botany Bay between the 2001 census and the 2006 census was 5.18%; and in the subsequent five years to the 2011 census, population growth was 5.19%. When compared with total population growth of Australia for the same periods, being 5.78% and 8.32% respectively, population growth in Botany Bay local government area was lower than the national average.

Council

Final composition and election method

Botany Bay City Council was composed of seven Councillors, including the Mayor, for a fixed four-year term of office. The Mayor was directly elected for a four-year term from 1995 to 2016 while the six other Councillors were elected proportionally as six separate wards, each electing one Councillor. From 1948 to 1995 the council consisted of 15 councillors/aldermen, with three elected in each of five wards. From 1995 to 2008, the councillors were elected at-large and from 2008 to 2012 the councillors were elected to three wards (A, B, C), with two Councillors elected in each. The most recent election was held on 8 September 2012. In Wards One and Five, only one candidate nominated for election. There being no additional candidates, the election for these Wards was uncontested. The final makeup of the Council at the last election for the term 2012–2016, including the Mayor, was as follows:

Mayors

Town Clerks/General Managers
The Local Government Act, 1993 removed the requirement that the administrative head of a council be a "Town or Shire Clerk" and specified that the head was to be known as the "General Manager".

References

External links
 City of Botany Bay website (Archived)

Botany Bay
Botany Bay
Botany Bay
Bayside Council
Botany Bay
Botany Bay